Two Medicine Falls is a waterfall located on the Two Medicine River in the southeastern portion of Glacier National Park, Montana, US.

References

Landforms of Glacier County, Montana
Landforms of Glacier National Park (U.S.)
Waterfalls of Glacier National Park (U.S.)